Robert Wohlmuth (1902–1987) was an Austrian film director and screenwriter. Following the Anschluss of 1938, Wohlmuth was forced to flee Austria. He went to America where he worked under the name Robert Wilmot.

Selected filmography

Director
 The Right to Live (1927)
 Love in May (1928)
 When the White Lilacs Bloom Again (1929)
 Ship of Girls (1929)
 The Cabinet of Doctor Larifari (1930) (parodying The Cabinet of Doctor Caligari)
 Fräulein Lilli (1936)

Screenwriter
 Hollywood and Vine (1945)

References

Bibliography
 Joshua Parker, Ralph J. Poole. Austria and America: Cross-Cultural Encounters 1865-1933. LIT Verlag Munster, 2014.

External links

1902 births
1987 deaths
Austrian male screenwriters
Austrian film directors
Austrian parodists
Parody film directors
Austrian emigrants to the United States
Emigrants from Austria after the Anschluss
Film people from Vienna
20th-century Austrian screenwriters
20th-century Austrian male writers